Dennis R. O'Connor,  was the Associate Chief Justice of Ontario from 2001–2012 and sat on the Court of Appeal for Ontario from 1998–2012.

O'Connor attended De La Salle College and Osgoode Hall Law School of York University in Toronto. He practised law from 1973 until 1976. From 1976 to 1980 he became a teacher at the University of Western Ontario Faculty of Law and from there went to practise litigation at Borden, Elliot in Toronto. He was a negotiator for the Government of Canada in the Yukon land claim debate.

He was eventually appointed to the Ontario Court of Appeal in 1998 and was elevated to Associate Chief Justice of Ontario in 2001.

He was appointed Commissioner in the Walkerton Inquiry in 2000, and was Commissioner in the Maher Arar Inquiry from 2004 to  2006.

On August 12, 2013, Toronto police chief Bill Blair announced that he had requested O'Connor conduct an internal review into the use of force by police.

On June 30, 2016, O'Connor was made an Officer of the Order of Canada by Governor General David Johnston for "his service to the legal profession and for his commitment to justice as a commissioner of the Walkerton and Arar inquiries." In 2016, he was made a member of the Order of Ontario.

References

External links
 Official Court Biography

See also
Maher Arar

Living people
Justices of the Court of Appeal for Ontario
Academic staff of the University of Western Ontario
Osgoode Hall Law School alumni
Officers of the Order of Canada
Members of the Order of Ontario
Year of birth missing (living people)